Haddon Storey   (born 15 May 1930) is a former Australian politician.

He was born in Melbourne to Elsdon Storey, a dentist, and Gwendoline Alberta Bellett, a dental nurse. He attended Scotch College and Melbourne University, where he received a Master of Law. He was admitted as a barrister and solicitor, and practiced from 1955. He was joint editor of the Law Council of Australia's newsletter from 1963 to 1969 and lecturer at the Council of Legal Education from 1963 to 1975. He was a long-standing member of the Liberal Party and served on the state executive from 1967 to 1971. In 1971 he was elected to the Victorian Legislative Council as a member for East Yarra. He was Attorney-General and Minister for Federal Affairs from 1978 to 1982, Minister for Consumer Affairs from 1981 to 1982, Minister for Gaming, the Arts, and Tertiary Education and Training from 1992 to 1996, and deputy party leader in the upper house from 1979 to 1992. He retired from politics in 1996.

Storey was made a Member of the Order of Australia in the 2012 Queen's Birthday Honours "For service to the Parliament of Victoria, particularly through law reform and contributions to cultural reinvigoration, to the arts through executive roles with cultural organisations, and to education."

References

1930 births
Living people
Liberal Party of Australia members of the Parliament of Victoria
Members of the Victorian Legislative Council
Attorneys-General of Victoria
Australian King's Counsel
Members of the Order of Australia